Twigworth is a small village near Gloucester in the Borough of Tewkesbury, Gloucestershire, England. The population of Twigworth Parish was 340 people in mid-2014 in 170 households. A planning application for 725 new homes in the parish of Twigworth was approved in December 2017.

The place-name 'Twigworth' is first attested in 1220, as 'Twigeworth', and is thought to mean 'enclosure made of twigs'.

Parish church

Twigworth parish church,  consecrated in 1844, is dedicated to St Matthew.

The poet and composer Ivor Gurney is buried in the churchyard. Next to Gurney's grave is that of Michael Howells, son of the composer Herbert Howells, who died in 1935 of polio aged nine. Howells later wrote a hymn tune entitled Twigworth for the hymn "God is love, let heaven adore him", one of two hymn tunes he composed in memory of his son (the other being Michael — "All my hope on God is founded").

In 2019, following a decision by the Diocese of Gloucester, St Matthew's Church was closed for public worship and the ecclesiastical parish of Twigworth was dissolved and merged into the parish of Sandhirst.

References 

Villages in Gloucestershire
Borough of Tewkesbury